Blue Cross (Blaukreuz) is a World War I chemical warfare agent consisting of diphenylchloroarsine (DA, Clark I), diphenylcyanoarsine (CDA, Clark II), ethyldichloroarsine (Dick), and/or methyldichloroarsine (Methyldick). Clark I and Clark II were the main agents used.

Clark I was used with Green Cross munition earlier; however for the first time it was used as a standalone agent in the night from July 10 to July 11 1917 at Nieuwpoort, Belgium, during "Operation Strandfest". The artillery munition used as a delivery vehicle contained a large amount of glass spheres closed with a cork and sealed with trinitrotoluene (TNT). Later N-ethylcarbazole was added. Depending on the caliber, the munition contained between 7 and 120 kilograms of the agent.

Blue Cross is also a generic World War I German marking for artillery shells with chemical payload affecting the upper respiratory tract.

See also 
 Green Cross (chemical warfare)
 Yellow Cross (chemical warfare)
 White Cross (chemical warfare)
 Lewisite

References 

Pulmonary agents
World War I chemical weapons
Organoarsenic chlorides
Weapons and ammunition introduced in 1917